NTV may refer to:

Television
 NTV (Bangladesh), a Bengali-language satellite television channel in Bangladesh
 NTV (India), Telugu regional channel
 NTV (Kenya)
 NTV (Mongolia), a television channel based in Mongolia
 NTV (Newport Television), University of Wales, Newport, UK
 NTV (Portugal), renamed to RTPN
 NTV (Russia), a Russian television channel
 NTV Plus, the brand name for the Russian digital satellite television service
 NTV Plus Sport, Russia's first dedicated sports channel
 NTV (Sri Lanka), a state-owned, English-language television channel
 NTV (Turkish TV channel), a nationwide television news channel
 NTV7, a Malaysian television network
 NTV Canada, Canadian Russian language channel
 NTV Montena, a regional broadcaster in Montenegro
 NTV PLUS, a city channel owned by the Government of Nepal
 NTV Uganda, TV station in Uganda
 NTV Variety, a satellite cable channel operated by Next TV in Taiwan
 KHGI-TV, an ABC affiliate licensed to Kearney, Nebraska, known on air as NTV News
 NASA TV, US
 Nauru Television, the state broadcaster of Nauru
 Nepal Television
 Next TV, or NTV, Taiwanese television station
 Nippon TV (Nittele), Minato, Tokyo, Japan 
 Norges Televisjon, Norway 
 Northern Television, a defunct two-station network in northern British Columbia, Canada
 Nova television (Bulgaria)
 Nusantara TV, Indonesian digital TV network
 n-tv, Germany
 CJON-DT (on-air name ntv), St. John's, Newfoundland and Labrador, Canada

Other 
 NTV Beleza, a football team which plays in Division 1 of Japan's Nadeshiko League
 Nuovo Trasporto Viaggiatori, World's first private open-access operator of 300 km/h high-speed trains
 Ngô Thanh Vân (born 1979), Vietnamese singer
 NTV, a section of British entertainment programme Noel's House Party